The 45° Targa Florio took place on 30 April 1961, on the Circuito Piccolo delle Madonie, (Sicily, Italy).  It was the second round of the F.I.A. World Sports Car Championship, and third round of the FIA GT Cup.

Report

Entry

The event attracted fewer cars than in previous seasons, with 64 racing cars were registered for this event, instead of the 78 in 1960, of which 57 arrived for practice. Only these, 54 qualified for, and started the race.

Reigning World Champions, Ferrari had entered two of their Ferrari 246 SP and a 250 TRI 61 for their squad of drivers; Willy Mairesse, Ricardo Rodríguez, Wolfgang von Trips, Olivier Gendebien, Phil Hill and Richie Ginther. As like 1960, there was no other factory entrants in the S3.0 class, their main opposition would come from the works Porsche 718 RS 61s of Hans Herrmann, Edgar Barth, Jo Bonnier, Dan Gurney, Graham Hill and Stirling Moss, despite these were smaller engined cars and less powerful, the marque had won the last two Targa Florios.

Race

At the start, Moss would take an immediate lead, which would eventually build up to around 90 seconds, with his team-mate Bonnier in second place. The leading Ferrari was that of von Trips and he would be trailing along further behind, yet it seemed more than obvious the Ferrari 246 SP just couldn’t match the overall performance of the nimble Porsches   The Ferrari of Phil Hill and Ginther suffered an accident of the very first lap, and was one of 24 cars that didn’t reach half distance.

After a few laps, Moss would have to hand the car over to Graham Hill. Hill’s inexperience of the event was coming into play. While he would stay out of trouble and would have a decent pace, it wouldn’t be fast enough as the Ferrari of von Trips and Gendebien took the overall lead by nearly 80 seconds, while Bonnier/Gurney fell back to third. Still, Hill had done his job, he complete a couple of laps and would hand the car back to Moss for the remainder of the race.

Moss picked up the pace quite dramatically and was soon right back up with the leading Ferrari. He wasn’t going to be stop and he soon was back in the lead. In reply, von Trips set an amazing fastest lap, with an average speed of 67.019 mph. Still heading into the final lap, he followed Moss in the running order. Moss headed into the last lap with a lead of more than a minute over the Ferrari. By this point he had covered more than 440 miles, when the differential failed. He was just a few miles around from victory.

The Ferrari of von Trips/Gendebien inherited the lead, to take the victory, completing 10 laps, covering 447.388 miles in just under 7½ hours of racing, averaging a speed of 64.272 mph. Second place went to the works Porsche of Bonnier and Gurney in a Porsche 718 RS 61, albeit over 4½ mins adrift. The podium was complete by another works Porsche, of Herrmann and Barth who were further 12 mins behind.

Official Classification

Class Winners are in Bold text.

 Fastest Lap: Wolfgang von Trips, 40:03.2secs (67.019 mph)

Class Winners

Standings after the race

Note: Only the top five positions are included in this set of standings.
Championship points were awarded for the first six places in each race in the order of 8-6-4-3-2-1. Manufacturers were only awarded points for their highest finishing car with no points awarded for positions filled by additional cars. Only the best 3 results out of the 5 races could be retained by each manufacturer. Points earned but not counted towards the championship totals are listed within brackets in the above table.

References

Further reading

Ed Heivink. Targa Florio: 1955-1973. Reinhard Klein.  

Targa Florio
Targa Florio
Targa Florio